Ashanti Akpan (born 24 November 2005) is a professional footballer who plays as a midfielder for Chelsea. Born in Poland, she represents England internationally.

Club career
Akpan was involved with the Chelsea senior squad for the first time when she was named on the bench in a 2–0 UEFA Women's Champions League win over Real Madrid Femenino on 23 November 2022, though she did not feature. Her debut came in a 3–1 Women's FA Cup win against Reading on 19 March 2023, when she came on as a second-half substitute for Sophie Ingle.

International career
Internationally, Akpan is eligible to play for Poland through her place of birth, for Nigeria through her Nigerian father, and for England. She was capped for the latter at the under-16 level.

Personal life
Akpan was born in Warsaw to a Polish mother and Nigerian father, and later moved to England with her family. She is the sister of fellow professional footballer Ashley Akpan.

Career statistics

Club

References

2005 births
Living people
Footballers from Warsaw
English women's footballers
England women's youth international footballers
Women's association football midfielders
Chelsea F.C. Women players
English sportspeople of Nigerian descent